Chevrens is a hamlet of Anières in Geneva, Switzerland.  A wine growing area  in a slender body of land between the French border and the left bank of Lake Geneva.

References

Geography of the canton of Geneva
Populated places on Lake Geneva